The 2021 Campeonato Brasileiro Feminino A-1 (officially the Brasileirão Feminino Neoenergia 2021 for sponsorship reasons) was the 9th season of the Campeonato Brasileiro de Futebol Feminino Série A1, the top level of women's football in Brazil, and the 5th edition in a Série A1 since its establishment in 2016. The tournament was organized by the Brazilian Football Confederation (CBF). It started on 17 April and ended on 26 September 2021.

In the finals, the defending champions Corinthians won their third title after defeating Palmeiras 4–1 on aggregate.

Format
In the group stage, each team played once against the other fifteen teams. Top eight teams qualified for the final stages. Quarter-finals, semi-finals and finals were played on a home-and-away two-legged basis.

Teams

Sixteen teams competed in the league – the top twelve teams from the previous season, as well as four teams promoted from the 2020 Série A2.

Number of teams by state

Stadiums and locations

Group stage
In the group stage, each team played on a single round-robin tournament. The top eight teams advanced to the quarter-finals of the knockout stages. The teams were ranked according to points (3 points for a win, 1 point for a draw, and 0 points for a loss). If tied on points, the following criteria would be used to determine the ranking: 1. Wins; 2. Goal difference; 3. Goals scored; 4. Fewest red cards; 5. Fewest yellow cards; 6. Draw in the headquarters of the Brazilian Football Confederation (Regulations Article 13).

Group A

Results

Final stages
Starting from the quarter-finals, the teams played a single-elimination tournament with the following rules:
Quarter-finals, semi-finals and finals were played on a home-and-away two-legged basis, with the higher-seeded team hosting the second leg.
If tied on aggregate, the penalty shoot-out would be used to determine the winners (Regulations Article 14).
Extra time would not be played and away goals rule would not be used in final stages.

Starting from the semi-finals, the teams were seeded according to their performance in the tournament. The teams were ranked according to overall points. If tied on overall points, the following criteria would be used to determine the ranking: 1. Overall wins; 2. Overall goal difference; 3. Draw in the headquarters of the Brazilian Football Confederation (Regulations Article 18).

Bracket

Quarter-finals

|}

Group B

Corinthians won 10–1 on aggregate and advanced to the semi-finals.

Group C

Palmeiras won 5–3 on aggregate and advanced to the semi-finals.

Group D

Internacional won 4–3 on aggregate and advanced to the semi-finals.

Group E

Ferroviária won 5–4 on aggregate and advanced to the semi-finals.

Semi-finals

|}

Group F

Corinthians won 6–2 on aggregate and advanced to the finals.

Group G

Paimeiras won 5–1 on aggregate and advanced to the finals.

Finals

|}

Group H

Top goalscorers

Awards

Individual awards
The following players were rewarded for their performances during the competition.

Best player: Bia Zaneratto (Palmeiras)
Breakthrough player: Rafa Levis (Grêmio)
Topscorer: Bia Zaneratto (Palmeiras)
Best goal of the tournament: Jayanne (Flamengo/Marinha, playing against Minas/ICESP (Group stage first round))
Best player (Internet-based poll): Rayanne (Flamengo/Marinha)

Best XI
The best XI team was a squad consisting of the eleven most impressive players at the tournament.

||

References

Women's football leagues in Brazil
2021 in Brazilian football